Drogo of Hauteville (c. 1010 – 10 August 1051) was the second Count of Apulia and Calabria (1046–51) in southern Italy. Initially he was only the leader of those Normans in the service of Prince Guaimar IV of Salerno, but after 1047 he was a territorial prince owing fealty directly to the Emperor.

Drogo was born in Normandy, a son of Tancred of Hauteville and his first wife, Muriella. Around 1035, he arrived with his elder brother William in southern Italy. With his brother, he took part in the campaign of the Byzantine catepan George Maniaches in Sicily (1038) and then in the campaign of Guaimar IV against the Byzantines in Apulia (1041). In 1042, Drogo was one of the twelve Norman leaders who met at Melfi to elect his brother William their first count under Guaimar's suzerainty. In the ensuing twelve-part division of the conquered territory in northern Apulia, Drogo received Venosa. In 1044–45, Drogo fought on behalf of his brother in Apulia. In 1045, he seized Bovino from the Byzantines.

After William's death in 1046, Drogo and Peter of Trani were vied to succeed him. Having the support of Guaimar, Drogo was elected by his fellow Normans. In 1047, Drogo married Altrude of Salerno, a Lombard princess. He reached an agreement with the Abbey of Montecassino, which intervened on his behalf to convince Guaimar to release the Norman count of Aversa, Rainulf II, whom he had imprisoned.

On 3 February 1047, while the Emperor Henry III was visiting southern Italy, he received Drogo's homage and invested him with all the territory which he already controlled. After this Drogo began using the title "Duke and Master of all Italy and Count of all the Normans of Apulia and Calabria". Although legally, as a direct vassal of the emperor, he was on the same plane as Guaimar, according to the opinion of the historian Ferdinand Chalandon, he remained a feudal dependent of the prince of Salerno. When Drogo's younger half-brother, Robert Guiscard, arrived in Italy before 1050, he was ordered to leave the service of Guaimar's rival, Prince Pandulf IV of Capua, presumably on account of Drogo's obligations to the former. Other newly arrived Normans also gave him trouble: Richard Drengot attacked him and was captured. Only the intervention of Guaimar could secure Richard's release late in 1047 or early in 1048.

In 1051, Drogo met with Pope Leo IX, when the latter visited southern Italy at the emperor's command to re-establish the "freedom of the church" (libertas ecclesiae). Leo forced a promise from Drogo that he would stop the Normans from pillaging. In August, as he was returning from this meeting with the pope, Drogo was assassinated at Monteilaro, near Bovino, the victim of a Byzantine conspiracy organised by the Catepan Argyrus, who was planning the reconquest of Apulia. Drogo was buried in the church of the Santissima Trinità in Venosa.

Drogo was succeeded by his younger brother Humphrey after a brief interregnum. A certain Richard, who joined the First Crusade, has been identified as Drogo's son.

Notes

Sources
Raoul Manselli. "Altavilla, Drogone d'". Dizionario Biografico degli Italiani, vol. 2, Alberto Ghisalberti (ed.) Rome: Istituto dell'Enciclopedia italiana, 1960.
H. M. Gwatkin and J. P. Whitney, edd. The Cambridge Medieval History, vol. 3. Cambridge: Cambridge University Press, 1926.
John Julius Norwich. The Normans in the South, 1016–1130. London: Longmans, 1967.
Ferdinand Chalandon. Histoire de la domination normande en Italie et en Sicilie. Paris: 1907.
Christopher Gravett and David Nicolle. The Normans: Warrior Knights and their Castles. Oxford: Osprey Publishing, 2006.
George Beech. A Norman-Italian Adventurer in the East: Richard of Salerno. 1993.

External links
History of the Norman World.

1051 deaths
Italo-Normans
Norman warriors
Counts of Apulia and Calabria
Assassinated royalty
Year of birth uncertain
Drogo
Burials at the Abbey of Santissima Trinità, Venosa